Philip John McMahon (1877 – April 15, 1913) was an American college football player, coach, and dentist. He was a 1900 graduate of the University of Pennsylvania School of Dental Medicine. While there, he lettered in football during the 1898 football season. McMahon served as the head football coach at the University of Vermont for one season in 1901, compiling a record of 5–5–1.

Head coaching record

References

External links
 

1877 births
1913 deaths
19th-century players of American football
20th-century dentists
American dentists
American football ends
Penn Quakers football players
Vermont Catamounts football coaches
University of Pennsylvania School of Dental Medicine alumni
People from Windsor, Vermont
Coaches of American football from Vermont
Players of American football from Vermont